2002 Kashiwa Reysol season

Competitions

Domestic results

J.League 1

Emperor's Cup

J.League Cup

Player statistics

Other pages
 J. League official site

Kashiwa Reysol
Kashiwa Reysol seasons